Hexura picea is a species of spider. It is from the dwarf tarantula family, Mecicobothriidae. It was described by Simon, 1884 — USA.

References

Mygalomorphae
Spiders of the United States
Spiders described in 1884